Robert Hanna Hammond (April 28, 1791 – June 2, 1847) was a Democratic member of the U.S. House of Representatives from Pennsylvania.

Biography
Robert Hanna Hammond was born in Milton, Pennsylvania.  He was a member of the state militia, with the rank of brigadier general.  He enlisted in the United States Army as a lieutenant in 1817.  He resigned and returned to Milton to serve as register and recorder of Northumberland County, Pennsylvania.  He served as postmaster of Milton from 1833 to 1837.

Hammond was elected as a Democrat to the twenty-fifth and twenty-sixth congresses.  He reentered the Army and was commissioned paymaster during the Mexican–American War.  He was wounded and ordered home on sick leave.  He died at sea before reaching port in 1847.  Interment in Milton Cemetery in Milton, Pennsylvania.

Sources

1791 births
1847 deaths
American military personnel of the Mexican–American War
Pennsylvania postmasters
People who died at sea
Democratic Party members of the United States House of Representatives from Pennsylvania
19th-century American politicians